Pontus Petterström (born April 21, 1982) is a Swedish former professional ice hockey winger. He last played for Skellefteå AIK of the Swedish Hockey League (SHL). He was selected by the New York Rangers in the 7th round (226th overall) of the 2001 NHL Entry Draft.

He previously played with Linköpings HC.

Career statistics

Regular season and playoffs

International

References

External links

1982 births
Living people
Linköping HC players
New York Rangers draft picks
Skellefteå AIK players
Swedish ice hockey forwards